Imam Shah Tahir bin Radi al-Din II al-Husayni ad-Dakkani was a Deccani (Muhammad-Shahi or Mu'mini) Nizari Ismaili Imam, astronomer, philosopher and minister of the Shia Nizam Shahi dynasty of Ahmednagar.

Early life 
Imam Shah Tahir was son of Imam Shah Razi-ud-Din II, a descendant of the Fatimid Caliphs of Egypt and a Nizari Ismaili Imam. After the establishment of Safavid dynasty and its surge against mysticism, he gave up Ismaili mysticism and joined Shah Ismail's court in early 1520 AD, but he had to leave Iran after Shah Ismail grew suspicious. He was a student of the great 16th century astronomer, Shams al-Din al-Khafri.

Life and Career in India 
Imam Shah Tahir arrived in Goa in mid-1520, but was ignored by the Adil Shahi monarch. He left Bijapur and moved to Parenda, where he started teaching almagest, a treatise by Ptolemy on astronomy. In 1522 AD, on request of Sultan Burhan Nizam Shah, he joined the court of Ahmadnagar. He also acted as chief diplomat. He used to deliver lectures twice a week in the fort. He persuaded King Burhan Nizam Shah to adopt Shi'ism.

He wrote many books, among them were:

 A commentary on the Almagest
 A commentary on theology of Avicenna
 Sharh Bab Hadi Ashr on theology
 Sharh Jafariyya on jurisprudence
 A commentary on Tafsir Bayzawi

Death 
He died in 1549 AD and his body was sent to Karbala to be buried near the tomb of Husayn ibn Ali. He had four sons and three daughters, among whom Imam Shah Haider succeeded him as Imam and a minister in the court.

Reference 

Indian Shia Muslims
Indian Shia clerics
Scholars from Lucknow
Shia Islam in India
Shia Islam in Pakistan
1549 deaths